Black Bean Games was an Italian video game publisher based in Gazzada Schianno in northern Italy, founded in 2004. Established as a European publishing arm of  video game distributor Leader S.p.A., it was best known for publishing a number of racing games developed by Milestone srl, but their portfolio also included real strategy and family-oriented games.

In 2006 the company signed a five-year licensing agreement for Superbike World Championship (SBK) and World Rally Championship (WRC) video games.

The company published titles between 2005 and 2012, before merging with Milestone srl.

Games published

References

Video game publishers
Italian companies established in 2004
Video game companies established in 2004
Video game companies disestablished in 2012
Defunct video game companies of Italy
Companies based in Lombardy
Italian companies disestablished in 2012